Markel Susaeta Laskurain (born 14 December 1987) is a Spanish former footballer who played as a right winger.

He spent almost the entirety of his professional career with Athletic Bilbao after making his debut with the first team in 2007, appearing in 507 competitive matches and scoring 56 goals for the club. He also played in Japan with Gamba Osaka, and in Australia with Melbourne City and Macarthur.

Susaeta won one full cap for Spain in 2012.

Club career

Athletic Bilbao
Born in Eibar, Gipuzkoa, Susaeta came through the ranks of Athletic Bilbao, spending one season with the farm team and another with the B side. At the start of 2007–08 he was also registered for the reserves, but was given his first-team debut on 2 September 2007 and managed to score in a 3–1 loss at FC Barcelona. He finished with 29 La Liga appearances, netting on four occasions.

In the following years, Susaeta established himself firmly in the first team, although still not an undisputed starter for the Basques. On 31 January 2009, he scored four minutes from time to give his team a 3–2 home win against Málaga CF, in an eventual narrow escape from relegation. He added six games in that campaign's Copa del Rey, as they reached the final against Barcelona.

Susaeta netted a career-best 13 official goals in 2011–12, including five in the season's UEFA Europa League as Athletic reached the final– the Lions also reached the decisive match in the domestic cup, once again against Barcelona.

Susaeta came on as a substitute in the 2015 Spanish Cup final, once more lost to Barcelona. He took the field in both legs of the following edition of the Supercopa de España, in which his team finally overcame the same opponent.

In September 2016, Susaeta broke the club record for appearances in European competition, passing the total of 55 set in the 1970s by goalkeeper José Ángel Iribar. In January 2019, he played in his 500th competitive match for Athletic, becoming only the fifth player in their history to reach that milestone (but still some way short of the overall record held by Iribar).

It was announced that Susaeta would leave at the end of the 2018–19 season when his contract ended; the player later commented that it had been his intention to play at San Mamés for his entire career and expressed disappointment at the circumstances. The club's final home match involved tributes to him, as well as fellow long-serving squad members Ander Iturraspe and Mikel Rico who were also departing in similar circumstances.

Later career 
On 9 September 2019, Susaeta joined J1 League club Gamba Osaka. The following 15 January, having made just seven appearances in Japan, he signed for Australia's Melbourne City FC for the rest of the A-League season; he left in mid-July, the delay in his release being due to the COVID-19 pandemic. 

Susaeta continued in the Australian top division in November 2020, teaming up with former Athletic teammate Beñat Etxebarria at Macarthur FC. Both retired at the end of the campaign, aged 34.

International career
On 9 November 2012, following a series of good displays, Susaeta was called up to the Spain national team for the first time, being selected by manager Vicente del Bosque for a friendly against Panama on the 14th and scoring the final goal in the 5–1 win in Panama City. He also featured for the unofficial Basque Country regional side.

Personal life
Susaeta's cousin, Néstor, was also a footballer and a winger. He unsuccessfully emerged through Basque neighbours Real Sociedad's youth system, and had a brief spell with Athletic's reserves.

Career statistics

Club

International

Scores and results list Spain's goal tally first, score column indicates score after each Susaeta goal.

Honours
Athletic Bilbao
Supercopa de España: 2015; runner-up: 2009
UEFA Europa League runner-up: 2011–12
Copa del Rey runner-up: 2008–09, 2011–12, 2014–15

References

External links

1987 births
Living people
Spanish footballers
Footballers from Eibar
Association football wingers
La Liga players
Segunda División B players
Tercera División players
CD Basconia footballers
Bilbao Athletic footballers
Athletic Bilbao footballers
J1 League players
Gamba Osaka players
A-League Men players
Melbourne City FC players
Macarthur FC players
Spain under-21 international footballers
Spain international footballers
Basque Country international footballers
Spanish expatriate footballers
Expatriate footballers in Japan
Expatriate soccer players in Australia
Spanish expatriate sportspeople in Japan
Spanish expatriate sportspeople in Australia